Hinckley Township may refer to the following townships in the United States:

 Hinckley Township, Medina County, Ohio
 Hinckley Township, Pine County, Minnesota